The Queen's Medal may refer to:

Queen's Medal for Champion Shots, several UK and Commonwealth awards
The Queen's South Africa Medal, awarded to military personnel who served in the Second Boer War between October 11, 1899 and May 31, 1902
The Queen's Medal for Music
Queen's Gold Medal for Poetry
The Royal Medals of the Royal Society in London
Queen's Medal, awarded at the Royal Military Academy Sandhurst
 Queen's Medal, awarded at the Royal Military College, Duntroon

See also
 King's Medal (disambiguation)